

Current shows

Past shows

Longest serving Australian game show hosts

See also

 List of Australian television series

References

External links
 A Brief History of Australian Game Shows

 
Game shows
Game shows
Australia